The 1986 Matchroom Professional Championship was the inaugural edition of the professional invitational snooker tournament which took place from 17 to 21 September 1986 in Southend-on-Sea, England.

The tournament featured six professional players, all part of Barry Hearn's Matchroom Sport stable. The tournament was won by Willie Thorne, who defeated Steve Davis 10–9 in the final. Thorne made a break of 137 in his opening match against Neal Foulds. The event was played at the same time as the 1986 Scottish Masters.

Tournament draw

References

Matchroom Professional Championship
Matchroom Professional Championship
Matchroom Professional Championship
Matchroom Professional Championship